Ross Matthew Birchard (born 11 February 1986), better known by the stage name Hudson Mohawke, is a Scottish-American producer, composer, and DJ from Glasgow. He is known for his influential work in 21st century hip-hop and electronic music. A founding member of the UK label collective LuckyMe, his fractured, colorful take on hip-hop made him a leading figure in the late-2000s wonky scene. He released his debut album Butter in 2009 on Warp Records. He has followed with the solo albums Lantern (2015) and Cry Sugar (2022), both on Warp.

Birchard is also one-half of the duo TNGHT with Canadian producer Lunice; their influential eponymous EP was released in 2012. That year, Birchard signed with Kanye West's G.O.O.D. Music production team, contributing to the label compilation Cruel Summer (2012) and West's LP Yeezus (2013). He subsequently became an in-demand producer, working with artists such as West, Pusha T, Drake, A$AP Rocky, Lil Wayne, Anohni, and Danny L Harle. In 2022, Birchard's 2011 song "Cbat" became an Internet meme and went viral on social media.

Life and career

Early years and LuckyMe 

Birchard is the son of actor and singer Paul Birchard.

At the age of 15, Birchard (under the name DJ Itchy) was the youngest UK DMC finalist. His earliest gigs as a club DJ were with Glasgow University's Subcity Radio where he first appeared as part of the culture city kids show and later as part of other shows including Turntable Science with Pro Vinylist Karim and Cloudo's Happy Hardcore show, under the alias DJ Mayhem. During this period, Birchard formed the Lucky Me collective with childhood friends. He adopted the stage name "Hudson Mohawke" after seeing the name engraved on a statue in the hallway of his accommodation. In 2007, Birchard applied to the Red Bull Music Academy and was invited to attend the event in Toronto, where he first met Steve Beckett of Warp Records, who was giving a lecture there, and was to sign Hudson Mohawke two years later.

In addition to his solo work, Hudson Mohawke collaborated with Mike Slott as Heralds of Change, releasing a series of 12" EPs including Show You (2006), Sittin' on the Side (2007), Puzzles (2007) and Secrets (2007) on All City Records. Hudson Mo was also DJ/Producer for the now defunct hip hop group Surface Emp alongside MC's Dom Sum and sometimes 2 Can Dan. Surface Empire released the LuckyMe EP in 2005 on Far Cut Records.

2008–2011: TNGHT and Warp 
In 2009, Hudson Mohawke signed to Warp Records, despite a very limited track record of official releases; in fact, the bulk of his releases were unofficial tracks and DJ mixes circulated on the Internet, as well as the 2006 mixtape Hudson's Heeters Vol. 1. His first official release to get major notice was entitled "Spotted" on the Rush Hour beat compilation Beat Dimensions Vol 1. In 2008 his 12" EP Ooops! on LuckyMe/Wireblock became an underground sensation, particularly once word spread of his recording contract with Warp. In 2009, Hudson Mohawke released his first studio album, Butter. In that year, he contributed a cover of a Jimi Tenor song, titled "Paint the Stars", to the Warp20 (Recreated) compilation. He would follow with several EPs, including 2011's Satin Panthers. He produced the debut EP for UK band Egyptian Hip Hop at Club Ralph Studios in London, which was released in August 2010. One of his songs, "100hm", has been featured as a track on the video game Grand Theft Auto V, while "Fuse" was featured in Sleeping Dogs and Dirt 3.

Birchard met Canadian producer Lunice during the first LuckyMe Records tour of North America in 2008, with Hudson Mohawke performing at the Pop Montreal festival and Lunice playing support. Following a successful performance headlining Warp Records' 2012 SXSW showcase, the duo's collaborative project TNGHT debuted their TNGHT EP, released via Warp X LuckyMe on 23 July 2012. TNGHT has performed at multiple venues internationally, including The Opera House, the Coachella music festival and Brooklyn's Music Hall of Williamsburg, which featured an appearance by rapper/producer Kanye West during a remix of West's "Cold".

2012–2016: G.O.O.D. Music and Lantern 
In 2012, Hudson Mohawke began a series of collaborations with Kanye West, resulting in production credits on the GOOD Music label album Cruel Summer.  On 17 January 2013, it was announced that Mohawke had officially signed with GOOD Music as a producer, whilst remaining with Warp and LuckyMe as a recording artist. TNGHT announced their hiatus on 27 December 2013. Mohawke co-produced two tracks on West's 2013 album Yeezus ("I Am a God" and "Blood on the Leaves") and contributed to West's 2016 follow-up The Life of Pablo, in addition to working with various other hip hop and pop artists, including Drake, Pusha T, and Future. In 2015, he released his second studio album, Lantern. In 2016, he collaborated with singer Anohni on her 2016 album Hopelessness. Mohawke announced on 26 October 2016 via Twitter that he was creating the original soundtrack for the 2016 video game Watch Dogs 2 titled "Ded Sec" and that Warp Records would release it on 11 November 2016.

2017–2022: 3PAC mixtapes, Cry Sugar and "Cbat" virality
In 2017, Birchard made a brief TV appearance in Twin Peaks: The Return as a roadhouse performer. In 2019, Birchard and Lunice reconvened for a second TNGHT EP titled II. In 2020, Birchard released three mixtapes of unreleased archival material dating to his earliest days: B.B.H.E., Poom Gems, and Airborn Lard, which were also collected as the compilation 3PAC. In 2021, he collaborated on Danny L Harle's album Harlecore.

In August 2022, Birchard released his third studio album as Hudson Mohawke, the Warp release Cry Sugar.

In September 2022, Birchard's song "Cbat", from his 2011 EP Satin Panthers, went viral on multiple websites after a Reddit user made a post about how the song's inclusion on their "sex playlist" ruined their relationship.

Musical style 
In 2015, Exclaim! wrote that Birchards's music has developed over the course of his career "from a glitch-y, turntablist jitter to a euphoric, multicolored trap-hop pound and everywhere in between." He has received praise for his "genre-smashing" production approach, in which styles of music are "incorporated, manipulated and bounced against each other." In 2009, during Birchard's debut Essential Mix, DJ Pete Tong proclaimed "Hudson Mohawke is doing for hip-hop what the Aphex Twin did for techno". In 2011, The Guardian characterized his trademark sound as "a vivid, psychedelic melange of J Dilla-esque instrumental hip hop, space-age R&B, bass boom and oldskool rave euphoria, garnished with effervescent FX from unexpected sources." Following the formation of TNGHT, Birchard and partner Lunice attempted to strip down their production styles and avoid tracks that were "all over the place". They pioneered the rave subgenre of trap, a style which Birchard called "a kind of parody genre" but which unexpectedly became popular at EDM festivals.

Discography 

Albums
Butter (2009, Warp)
Lantern (2015, Warp)
Ded Sec – Watch Dogs 2 (Original Game Soundtrack) (2016, Warp)
Cry Sugar (2022, Warp)

Mixtapes
Hudson's Heeters (2006, LuckyMe)
B.B.H.E. (2020, Warp)
Poom Gems (2020, Warp)
Airborne Lard (2020, Warp)

Compilations
3PAC (2020, Warp)

EPs
Lucky Me (2005) (as Surface Empire)
Choices Vol. 1 (2007)
Puzzles (2007)
Secrets (2007)
Polyfolk Dance (2009)
Satin Panthers (2011)
TNGHT (2012) (as TNGHT)
Hud Mo 100 (2013)
Chimes (2014)
II (2019) (as TNGHT)

Singles
"Oops!" (2008)
"Star Crackout" / "Root Hands" / "Everybody Else Is Wrong" (2008)
"Higher Ground" (2012) (as TNGHT)
"Acrylics" (2013) (as TNGHT)
"Chimes" (2014)
"Chimes" (Rmx) (ft. Pusha T, French Montana, Travis Scott, Future)
"Serpent" (2019) (as TNGHT)
"Dollaz" (2019) (as TNGHT)
"Black Cherry" (2020)
"BENT" (2020) (with Jimmy Edgar)
"What U Need" (2020)
"Interlocked" (with Danny L Harle as DJ Mayhem) (2021)

Production work
Declaime – "Show Me" (2008)
Nadsroic – Room Mist (2009)
Egyptian Hip Hop – Some Reptiles Grew Wings (2010)
Kanye West, Big Sean, Pusha T, and 2 Chainz – "Mercy" (2012)
John Legend and Teyana Taylor – "Bliss" (2012)
Kanye West, Big Sean, 2 Chainz, Marsha Ambrosius, and Cocaine 80s – "The One" (2012)
Kanye West and R. Kelly – "To the World" (2012)
Azealia Banks – "Jumanji" (2012)
Dominic Lord – "Pierce" (2012)
Buddy Leezle – "The Luv (Mo Mix)" from The Legend of Buddy Leezle (2013)
Trek Life & DJ Rhettmatic – "What Is It" from Hometown Heroes Mixtape (2013)
Kanye West – "I Am a God" and "Blood on the Leaves" from Yeezus (2013)
Drake – "Connect" from Nothing Was the Same (2013)
Pusha T – "Hold On" and "No Regrets" from My Name Is My Name (2013)
Lil Wayne – "Lay It Down" from I Am Not a Human Being II (2013)
Distantstarr – "Feste" and "Buttafly" from The Vibe (2014)
Chynna – "MadeInChynna" (2014)
Selah Sue – "The Light" from Reason (2015)
Pusha T – "M.F.T.R." from King Push – Darkest Before Dawn: The Prelude (2015)
A$AP Rocky – "Everyday" from At. Long. Last. ASAP (2015)
Kanye West – "Famous", "Freestyle 4", "Waves", and "FML" from The Life of Pablo (2016)
Bodega Bamz – "GHOST" (2016)
Anohni – Hopelessness (2016)
Anohni – Paradise (2017)
Christina Aguilera – "Maria" from Liberation (2018)
Banks – "Gimme" (2019)
Danny L Harle – "Interlocked", "All Night" and "Shining Stars" from Harlecore (2021)

Remixes
Lukid – "The Now (Remix by Hudson Mohawke)" from The Now EP (2007)
Super Smoky Soul – "Geek Beat (Hud Mo Retwirk)" from Cycling EP (2007)
O Liffey Family – "Rock the Spot: Heralds of Change Redub" from Cold Liffey (2007)
Ghislain Poirier – "No More Blood (Hudson Mohawke Remix)" (2008)
Fool – "Seventh (Hudson Mohawke RMX)" from Real Thing (2008)
Crookers – "Put Your Hands on Me (Hudson Mohawke Mix)" (2009)
Free Moral Agents – "Ageless (Hudson Mohawke Mix)" (2009)
Dan Deacon – "Woof Woof (Hudson Mohawke Remix)" (2009)
Uffie – "ADD SUV (Hudson Mohawke's Spam Fajita Remix)" (2010)
American Men – "AM System (Hudson Mohawke Remix)" from Cool World (2010)
De De Mouse – "My Favorite Swing (Hudson Mohawke's Cobra Slice Rework)" from A Journey to Freedom Remixes (2010)
Krystal Klear – "Tried for Your Love (Hudson Mohawke Remix)" (2010)
Games – "Strawberry Skies (Hudson Mohawke Remix)" (2010)
Wiley – "Electric Boogaloo (Hudson Mohawke Remix)" (2010)
Jamie Woon – "Lady Luck (Hudson Mohawke's Schmink Wolf Re-Fix)" (2011)
B.o.B – "Satellite (Hudson Mohawke Remix)" (2011)
Gucci Mane – "Party Animal (Hudson Mohawke Remix)" (2011)
Björk – "Virus (Hudson Mohawke Peaches and Guacamol Remix)" from Bastards (2012)
Battles – "Rolls Bayce (Hudson Mohawke Remix)" from Dross Glop (2012)
Jackson & His Computer Band – "Vista (Hudson Mohawke Remix)" from G.I. Jane (Fill Me Up)'' (2013)
Disclosure – "White Noise (Hudson Mohawke Remix)" (2013)
Paolo Nutini – "Iron Sky (Hudson Mohawke Remix)" (2014)
Duck Sauce – "NRG (Hudson Mohawke Remix)" (2014)
Four Tet – "Parallel Jalebi (Hudson Mohawke Remix)" (2014)
Above & Beyond – "All Over the World (Hudson Mohawke Remix)" (2015)
Boards of Canada – "Amo Bishop Roden (Hudson Mohawke Remix)" (2016)
DJ Shadow – "Midnight in a Perfect World (Hudson Mohawke Mix)" (2016)
Lo Moon – "Loveless (Hudson Mohawke Remix)" (2017)

References

External links 
Hudson Mohawke official website
LuckyMe official website

1986 births
Living people
Scottish record producers
Scottish DJs
People educated at St Thomas Aquinas Secondary School, Glasgow
Place of birth missing (living people)
Warp (record label) artists
GOOD Music artists
Scottish electronic musicians
Electronic dance music DJs